KSPK-LD, virtual and UHF digital channel 28, is a low-powered AMGTV-Youtoo America-affiliated television station licensed to Walsenburg, Colorado, United States. It is also seen through four translators (also on channel 28): KSBK-LD in Colorado Springs, Colorado; K34GI-D in Trinidad, Colorado; K24IY-D in Raton, New Mexico; and K27MT-D in the San Luis Valley, Colorado. KSPK-LD is carried in Walsenburg by Charter Cable on channel 16 and in Colorado City on TVision channel 10.

The station is owned by the Mainstreet Broadcasting Company, a local Colorado corporation also based in Walsenburg.

Translators

KSPK-LD
Television channels and stations established in 2005
2005 establishments in Colorado